Kaito (written: 海斗, 開士, 魁斗, 海翔, 海人, 快斗, 凱斗 or 海都) is a masculine Japanese given name. Notable people with the name include:

, Japanese footballer
, Japanese footballer
 Baruto Kaito (born 1984, surname Baruto), Estonian professional sumo wrestler
, Japanese footballer
, Japanese voice actor
, Japanese professional wrestler
, Japanese actor and model
, Japanese footballer
, Japanese football player

Fictional characters
 Kaito (software), Vocaloid singing synthesizer
, The Phantom Thief Kid from Detective Conan manga series
 Kaito Momota, character in Danganronpa V3: Killing Harmony
Kaito, main character in the anime Mermaid Melody as the love interest of the mermaid Princess Lucia of the Pacific Ocean
 Yuna D. Kaito, character in the manga and ongoing 2018 anime of Cardcaptor Sakura: Clear Card
 Kaito Tenjou, character in Yu-Gi-Oh! Zexal
 Kaito, character in Hunter × Hunter
 Kaito, character in Project Kaito by Michael Chasteen

See also
 Kaito (disambiguation)
 Kato (disambiguation)

References 

Japanese masculine given names